Yamarrinh Wachangan Islands (Denham Group) is a national park in Queensland, Australia, 2098 km northwest of Brisbane.

The park is the largest nesting place for hawksbill turtles and also supports the roosting and nesting of a large number of seabirds.

Vegetation consists of grassy areas, small parts of low closed forests, marginal mangroves and shrubs.

References

See also

 Protected areas of Queensland

National parks of Far North Queensland
Protected areas established in 1921
1921 establishments in Australia